Joris Loefs (born 18 April 1973) is a Dutch rower. He competed in the men's quadruple sculls event at the 1996 Summer Olympics.

References

1973 births
Living people
Dutch male rowers
Olympic rowers of the Netherlands
Rowers at the 1996 Summer Olympics
Sportspeople from Breda